Rebecca Reynolds may refer to:

 Rebecca Reynolds (poet), American poet
 Rebecca Reynolds (politician) (born 1949), American politician in the state of Iowa